Jorunn is a feminine Norwegian given name. In Norse, "jór/iór" means "horse", and "unna" means "love". Alternatively, the first word may be derived from "jǫfurr", which means "king" or "chieftain", derived from a term that originally meant "wild boar [helmet]". 

Notable people with the name include:

Jorunn Hageler, Norwegian politician
Jorunn Hareide, Norwegian historian of literature
Jorunn Horgen, Norwegian windsurfer
Jorunn Johnsen, Norwegian journalist
Jorunn Kjellsby, Norwegian actress
Jorunn Økland, Norwegian theologian
Jorunn Ringstad, Norwegian politician
Jorunn Teigen, Norwegian orienteering competitor
Jórunn skáldmær, Norwegian skald
Jorunn Sundgot-Borgen, Norwegian professor of sports medicine
Jórunn Viðar, Icelandic pianist and composer

Norwegian feminine given names